Spotted by Locals is a publisher of a series of travel guides (apps & blogs) with up to date tips curated by handpicked locals in 80+ cities in Europe, The Middle East and North America.

The city guides are curated by "Spotters" - people who live in the city they write about and speak the local language. All Spotters are selected by founders Sanne & Bart van Poll.

Spotted by Locals provides recommendations submitted by actual local residents on where to eat, shop, be entertained and more. The city guide is aimed at travelers who want to avoid tourist highlights and experience cities like a local.

Spotted by Locals has created content for publications such as The Guardian Sueddeutsche Zeitung, The Independent, De Volkskrant, Kathimerini and commercial content licensing partners like Volkswagen.

Every 2 years, Spotted by Locals organizes a weekend for its bloggers.

References

External links 
 

Dutch travel websites
Travel guide books
City guides
IOS software
Android (operating system) software